Giancarlo Galli (6 March 1931 – 6 November 2022), commonly known as Carlo Galli, was an Italian footballer who played as a striker.

Club career
Galli played for 16 seasons (305 games, 111 goals) in the Italian Serie A for U.S. Città di Palermo, A.S. Roma, A.C. Milan, Udinese Calcio, Genoa C.F.C. and S.S. Lazio. He was one of manager Giuseppe "Gipo" Viani's favourite players, and he coached while at both Palermo and Roma, before joining him at Milan in 1956, in exchange for an ageing Gunnar Nordahl. In his five seasons with Milan, Galli won two Serie A titles, and scored 47 goals, including five in a 6–1 home win over Lazio on 13 April 1958 at the San Siro.

International career
At international level, Galli earned 13 caps and scored 5 goals for the Italy national team between 1953 and 1959, and participated in the 1954 FIFA World Cup.

Style of play
A tall and slender player, Galli was known for his acrobatic skills as a forward, as well as his heading accuracy and ability in the air, which enabled him to function as a centre-forward. Throughout his career he was nicknamed "Carletto," as well as "Testina d'oro" (golden head), and "Esile giunco" (skinny reed), due to his playing style, aerial prowess, and physical build.

Honours
Milan
Serie A: 1956–57, 1958–59

Roma
Serie B: 1951–52

Genoa
Serie B: 1961–62
Coppa delle Alpi: 1964

Italy
Mediterranean Cup: 1950–1953

Individual
A.C. Milan Hall of Fame

References

External links
 Career summary by playerhistory.com 
 Profile at enciclopediadelcalcio.it 
 Profile at FIGC 
 

1931 births
2022 deaths
Sportspeople from the Province of Pistoia
Italian footballers
Footballers from Tuscany
Association football forwards
Italy international footballers
1954 FIFA World Cup players
Serie A players
Serie B players
Palermo F.C. players
A.S. Roma players
A.C. Milan players
Udinese Calcio players
Genoa C.F.C. players
S.S. Lazio players